Caeciliidae is the family of common caecilians.  They are found in Central and South America.  Like other caecilians, they superficially resemble worms or snakes.

Although they are the most diverse of the caecilian families, the caeciliids do have a number of features in common that distinguish them from other caecilians. In particular, their skulls have relatively few bones, with those that are present being fused to form a solid ram to aid in burrowing through the soil. The mouth is recessed beneath the snout, and there is no tail.

Many caeciliids lay their eggs in moist soil. The eggs then hatch into aquatic larvae, which live in seepages in the soil, or in small streams. However, some species lack a larval stage, with the eggs hatching into juveniles with the same form as the adults, or else lack eggs and give birth to live young.

Phylogeny
Traditional taxonomy, which is reflected in the "Scientific Classification" box in this article, categorizes extant amphibia into three orders: Anura (frogs and toads), Caudata (newts and salamanders), and Gymnophiona (caecilians).  However, there is considerable debate among paleontologists and molecular geneticists concerning the phylogenetic relationship between amphibians, and indeed whether Amphibia is a monophyletic clade or a polyphyletic collection of diverse evolutionary lineages.

The more limited debate (operating on the assumption that Amphibia is a monophyletic clade) is whether Caudata is more closely related to Anura (in a shared clade called Batrachia — the traditional view) or to Gymnophiona (suggested by research in 2005).  The broader debate is whether Amphibia is monophyletic or polyphyletic.  The latter view considers Caudata and Gymnophiona to be more closely related to amniotes (reptiles, mammals and birds) than to Anura.

Species

Genus Caecilia – common caecilians
Caecilia abitaguae
Caecilia albiventris
Caecilia antioquiaensis
Caecilia aprix
Caecilia armata
Caecilia atelolepis
Caecilia attenuata
Caecilia bokermanni
Caecilia caribea
Caecilia corpulenta
Caecilia crassisquama
Caecilia degenerata
Caecilia disossea
Caecilia dunni
Caecilia epicrionopsoides
Caecilia flavopunctata
Caecilia goweri
Caecilia gracilis
Caecilia guntheri
Caecilia inca
Caecilia isthmica
Caecilia leucocephala
Caecilia macrodonta
Caecilia marcusi
Caecilia mertensi
Caecilia museugoeldi
Caecilia nigricans
Caecilia occidentalis
Caecilia orientalis
Caecilia pachynema
Caecilia perdita
Caecilia pressula
Caecilia pulchraserrana
Caecilia subdermalis
Caecilia subnigricans
Caecilia subterminalis
Caecilia tentaculata
Caecilia tenuissima
Caecilia thompsoni
Caecilia volcani
Genus Oscaecilia – South American caecilians
Oscaecilia bassleri
Oscaecilia elongata
Oscaecilia equatorialis
Oscaecilia hypereumeces
Oscaecilia koepckeorum
Oscaecilia ochrocephala
Oscaecilia osae
Oscaecilia polyzona
Oscaecilia zweifeli

References

Further reading 
 
 
 
 
 Frost, Darrel R. 2004. Amphibian Species of the World: an Online Reference. Version 3.0 (22 August 2004) American Museum of Natural History, New York, USA
 AmphibiaWeb: Information on amphibian biology and conservation. 2004. Berkeley, California: AmphibiaWeb. Retrieved 26 August 2004

 
Amphibian families
Taxa named by Constantine Samuel Rafinesque